Maumwee Lough is a freshwater lake in the Connemara area of County Galway, Ireland.

Geography and hydrology
The lake drains to the south and is part of the Corrib catchment.

Natural history
Fish species in Maumwee Lough include brown trout, common minnow, salmon and the critically endangered European eel. Brown trout are the most abundant. Three-spined stickleback have sometimes been found in the lake. Maumwee Lough is part of the Maumturk Mountains Special Area of Conservation. This SAC also includes Lough Shindilla.

See also
List of loughs in Ireland

References

Lakes of County Galway